The 1936 Kilkenny Senior Hurling Championship was the 42nd staging of the Kilkenny Senior Hurling Championship since its establishment by the Kilkenny County Board.

Mooncoin won the championship after a 4–02 to 4–01 defeat of Tullaroan in the final. It was their 11th championship title overall and their first title in four championship seasons.

References

Kilkenny Senior Hurling Championship
Kilkenny Senior Hurling Championship